Domenico Grosso (15 June 1922 –  13 August 2005) was an Italian gymnast. He competed in eight events at the 1948 Summer Olympics.

References

External links
 

1922 births
2005 deaths
Italian male artistic gymnasts
Olympic gymnasts of Italy
Gymnasts at the 1948 Summer Olympics
People from Legnano
Sportspeople from the Metropolitan City of Milan